The 1947–48 BAA season was the Stags' second season in the Basketball Association of America (later known as the NBA).

Draft picks

Roster

Regular season

Season standings

Record vs. opponents

Game log

Playoffs

Western Division tiebreaker
Chicago Stags vs. Washington Capitols: Stags win series 1-0
Game 1 @ Chicago (March 23): Chicago 74, Washington 70

Chicago Stags vs. Baltimore Bullets: Bullets win series 1-0
Game 1 @ Chicago (March 25): Baltimore 75, Chicago 72

First round
(E3) Boston Celtics vs. (W3) Chicago Stags: Stags win series 2-1
Game 1 @ Boston (March 28): Chicago 79, Boston 72
Game 2 @ Boston (March 31): Boston 81, Chicago 77
Game 3 @ Boston (April 2): Chicago 81, Boston 74

Semifinals
(W2) Baltimore Bullets vs. (W3) Chicago Stags: Bullets win series 2-0
Game 1 @ Chicago (April 7): Baltimore 73, Chicago 67
Game 2 @ Baltimore (April 8): Baltimore 89, Chicago 72

Transactions

Sales

References

Chicago Stags seasons
Chicago